Yang Yongchao (born August 25, 1998) is a Chinese pair skater who currently competes with Zhang Siyang. With his former partner, Tang Feiyao, he has competed in the final segment at two World Junior Championships and finished within the top four at the 2019 edition.

Programs

With Zhang

With Tang

With Han

Competitive highlights 
GP: Grand Prix; CS: Challenger Series; JGP: Junior Grand Prix

Pairs with Zhang

Pairs with Tang

Pairs with Han

Pairs with Sui

References

External links 
 

1998 births
Chinese male pair skaters
Living people
Figure skaters from Changchun